1 Corinthians 6 is the sixth chapter of the First Epistle to the Corinthians in the New Testament of the Christian Bible. It is authored by Paul the Apostle and Sosthenes in Ephesus. In this chapter, Paul deals with lawsuits among believers and with sexual immorality.

Text
The original text was written in Koine Greek. This chapter is divided into 20 verses.

Textual witnesses
Some early manuscripts containing the text of this chapter are:
Codex Vaticanus (AD 325–350)
Codex Sinaiticus (330–360)
Codex Alexandrinus (400–440)
Codex Ephraemi Rescriptus (~450)
Papyrus 11 (7th century; extant verses 5–9, 11–18)

Lawsuits among believers
Paul criticises those who take up lawsuits with other believers before the civil authorities – those who have no standing in the church. There should be people within the church who are "wise enough to decide between one believer [or brother] and another": Paul asks whether there are any of these people, and states that it would be better to be wronged and to be defrauded than to take a matter to court before the "unrighteous" – for that is itself a greater fraud.

Theologian Albert Barnes treats Paul's question as rhetorical: "Can it be that in the Christian church – the church collected in refined and enlightened Corinth – there is not a single member so wise, intelligent and prudent that his brethren may have confidence in him, and refer their causes to him?" William Robertson Nicoll, in the Expositor's Greek Testament, argues in contrast that "The litigation shows that there is no man in the Church wise enough to settle such matters privately; or he would surely have been called in."

Martin Luther, Beza, Lachmann, Osiander, Hofmann and Meyer "make the passage sterner and more telling" as an assertion than the common way of viewing it as a question, which is adopted also by Tischendorf and Ewald.

Verse 9 

 Cross reference: 1 Timothy 1:10
 "Homosexuals" (KJV: "effeminates"): catamites, those submitting to homosexuals
 "Sodomites": male homosexuals

In 2019, Australian rugby player Israel Folau paraphrased from 1 Corinthians 6:9 on social media and was subsequently stripped of his multi million dollar contract when he refused to recant the post. $2 million was raised by the Australian Christian Lobby for his court costs. His appeal was subsequently settled.

Verse 10

Verse 12 

 "helpful" (NKJV) or "expedient" (KJV): Gill comments that "everything is not lawful to be done when the doing of them destroys the peace, comfort, and edification of others; when it stumbles and grieves weak minds, and causes offence to them"; see (1 Corinthians 10:23), so not "expedient" to use this liberty, to grieve a weak brother or to make oneself a "slave to one's appetite".

Verse 16 

 Cross references: Genesis 2:24

Verse 19

"You are not your own": the believers are often reminded in the Scripture (cf. 1 Corinthians 7:22; Romans 6:18; Romans 6:22; John 8:30; Romans 14:8) that they "have passed from slavery to sin into slavery to Christ", but the slavery in Christ is the "true freedom of man", which enable a person to fulfil the law of one's being.

Verse 20

Cross reference: 1 Corinthians 7:23

The majority of early manuscripts end this chapter with the words . The Textus Receptus adds , which the New King James Version translates as "and in your spirit, which are (i.e. body and spirit) God's". The Cambridge Bible for Schools and Colleges notes that "these words are not found in many of the best MSS. and versions, and they somewhat weaken the force of the argument, which is intended to assert the dignity of the body. They were perhaps inserted by some who, missing the point of the Apostle's argument, thought that the worship of the spirit was unduly passed over."

See also 
 Holy Spirit
 Related Bible parts: Genesis 2, Romans 8, 1 Corinthians 5

References

External links 
 King James Bible - Wikisource
English Translation with Parallel Latin Vulgate
Online Bible at GospelHall.org (ESV, KJV, Darby, American Standard Version, Bible in Basic English)
Multiple bible versions at Bible Gateway (NKJV, NIV, NRSV etc.)

 
06